Bheemadevarpalle is a mandal in  hanumakonda district in the state of Telangana in India.

References 

Villages in Hanamkonda district